Güzelhisar (literally "beautiful fortress" in Turkish) may refer to the following places in Turkey:

 The former name of Aydın
 Güzelhisar, Akyurt, a neighborhood of the district of Akyurt, Ankara Province
 Güzelhisar Dam
 Güzelhisar, Köprüköy